Mister World 2007 was the 5th edition of the Mister World competition. It was held on March 31, 2007 at the Crown of Beauty Theatre in Sanya, China. Gustavo Gianetti of Brazil crowned Juan Garcia Postigo of Spain at the end of the event.

Results

Placements

Teams

Contestants

References

External links 
 Official Mister World site
 Official PR Team

Mister World
2007 in China
2007 beauty pageants
Beauty pageants in China